Qamrul Hassan Bhuiyan (24 July 1952 – 6 August 2018) was a Bangladeshi Major in the Bangladesh Army. He was a freedom fighter, liberation war researcher and writer. He was the founder chairman of Center for Liberation War Studies. He received Bangla Academy Award in the year 2018 for his contribution to the liberation war literature.

Early life and education
Bhuiyan was born on 24 July 1952 in Comilla district. He studied at Jessore Zilla School and Jhenaidah Cadet College. He graduated in China in 1983 from Beijing Language and Culture University.

Career
Bhuiyan was a HSC examinee in 1971. When the Bangladesh Liberation War started, he joined the war. He fought under Sector 2 of the War of Liberation.

Bhuiyan joined Bangladesh Army on 9 January 1974. On 11 January 1975 he was commissioned in the 4th East Bengal Regiment as a Second Lieutenant.

Published books 
Among his published books, the number of books on liberation war is 23, one is written on military history and three children's books. Among them, the books on liberation war are:

 Jonojudder Gonojodda
 Bijoye Hoye Firbo Naile Firbo Na
 Dui No sector Abong K fource Commender Khaleder Kotha (Edited)
 Ekattorer Konna, Jaya, Janonira
 Potakar Proti Pronodona
 Muktijodde Sishu-kishorder Obodan
 Ekattorer Dinponji

Death 
Bhuiyan died at the Combined Military Hospital (CMH) of Dhaka on 6 August 2018. He was suffering from diabetes and kidney related complications.

References

1952 births
2018 deaths
Bangladeshi male writers
Recipients of Bangla Academy Award
Bangladesh Army generals
People from Comilla District